Epiblema arizonana is a moth belonging to the family Tortricidae. The species was first described by Powell in 1975.

It is native to Arizona.

References

Eucosmini
Moths described in 1975
Endemic fauna of Arizona